is a town located in Nagano Prefecture, Japan. , the town had an estimated population of 15,562 in 6897 households, and a population density of 260 persons per km².

Geography
Miyota is located on the eastern border of Nagano Prefecture with Gumma Prefecture. Mount Asama (2568 meters) is within the town's northern borders.

The Citizen Watch group has other engineering facilities in the adjacent town of Saku, Nagano.

Surrounding municipalities
Nagano Prefecture
 Komoro
Karuizawa
Saku
Gumma Prefecture
 Tsumagoi

Climate
The town has a humid continental climate characterized by warm and humid summers, and cold winters with heavy snowfall  (Köppen climate classification Dfb).  The average annual temperature in Miyota is 8.2 °C. The average annual rainfall is 1291 mm with September as the wettest month. The temperatures are highest on average in August, at around 21.1 °C, and lowest in January, at around -4.0 °C.

Demographics 
Per Japanese census data, the population of Miyota has nearly doubled over the past 60 years.

History
The area of present-day Miyota was part of ancient Shinano Province, and was the site of the Battle of Odaihara during the Sengoku period. As Otai-shuku, it developed as a post station on the Nakasendo highway connecting Edo with Kyoto during the Edo period. The village of Miyota was created with the establishment of the modern municipalities system on April 1, 1889. It merged with the villages of Onuma and Goka to form the town of Miyota on September 30, 1956.

Politics and government 
Miyota is governed by a town council with 14 members.

Elections 
 2007 Miyota mayoral election

Education
Miyota has two public elementary schools and one public middle school operated by the town government. The town does not have a high school.

Transportation

Railway
 Shinano Railway

Highway

Local attractions
Otai-shuku, post station on the Nakasendō
Mount Asama

References

External links

Official Website 

 
Towns in Nagano Prefecture